Michael Arthur Rawson (26 May 1934 – 26 October 2000) was a track and field athlete.

Athletics career
He represented Great Britain in the men's 800 metres at the 1956 Summer Olympics in Melbourne, Australia. He won the gold medal in that event, two years later at the 1958 European Championships in Stockholm, Sweden. He represented England and won a bronze medal in the 880 yards at the 1958 British Empire and Commonwealth Games in Cardiff, Wales.

He represented Birchfield Harriers and on his retirement from the sport spent many years coaching at Birchfield and working as an athletics reporter for the BBC and local newspapers.

Rawson worked for the British Olympic Association at a number of Olympic Games.

He died after a short illness on 26 October 2000 in Birmingham.

References

External links
 
 Profile at Sporting Heroes
 Profile at TOPS in athletics

1934 births
2000 deaths
Sportspeople from Birmingham, West Midlands
English male middle-distance runners
Olympic athletes of Great Britain
Athletes (track and field) at the 1956 Summer Olympics
Commonwealth Games medallists in athletics
Athletes (track and field) at the 1958 British Empire and Commonwealth Games
European Athletics Championships medalists
Commonwealth Games bronze medallists for England
Medallists at the 1958 British Empire and Commonwealth Games